Canasta, Spanish for basket, is a card game of the rummy family.

Canasta may also refer to:

 Canasta (band), a Chicago-based chamber pop sextet
 Canasta uruguaya, a 1951 Mexican film
 Chan Canasta, a professional magician
 Nasty Canasta, a character in the Merrie Melodies and Looney Tunes cartoons
 Nasty Canasta (burlesque), a New York City-based neo-burlesque performer
 Ponytail Canasta, a variation of the card game canasta